James Scott Ridge has been Chaplain-General of Prisons (and Archdeacon of Prisons) since 2018.

Early life and education

Ridge was  born in 1977 and educated at Exeter University, Selwyn College, Cambridge, and Westcott House, Cambridge.

Ordained ministry

Ridge was ordained deacon in 2005 and priest in 2006. After a curacy in Halstead he became a prison chaplain.

References

1977 births
Alumni of the University of Exeter
Alumni of Westcott House, Cambridge
Alumni of Selwyn College, Cambridge
Chaplains-General of Prisons
Living people
21st-century English Anglican priests